Punt is a surname. Notable people with the surname include:

 Anita Punt (born 1987), New Zealand field hockey player
 Harald Punt (born 1952), Dutch rower
 Jos Punt (born 1946), Dutch bishop
 Piet Punt (1909–1973), Dutch footballer
 Steve Punt (born 1962), British comedian, of Punt and Dennis
 Terry L. Punt (1949–2009), American (Pennsylvanian) politician

See also
 Pundt

Dutch-language surnames